The former United States Post Office is a historic post office building located at Mount Olive, Wayne County, North Carolina.  It was designed by the Office of the Supervising Architect under James A. Wetmore and built in 1931–1933. It is a two-story, seven bay, "T"-shaped, brick building in the Classical Revival style. The central five bays of the front facade features a colonnade of six unfluted Roman Ionic order columns in antis. The building has been converted to office space.

It was listed on the National Register of Historic Places in 1995. It is located in the Mount Olive Historic District.

References

Mount Olive
Neoclassical architecture in North Carolina
Government buildings completed in 1933
Buildings and structures in Wayne County, North Carolina
National Register of Historic Places in Wayne County, North Carolina
Historic district contributing properties in North Carolina